Abdelaziz Abdallah Salem, an Egyptian engineer and the first president of Confederation of African Football (CAF).

In tribute to Abdelaziz Salem, the first trophy (from 1957 to 1978) of the African Cup of Nations football is called "Abdelaziz Abdallah Salem Trophy".

Career 
He was president of the Egyptian Football Association from 1952 to 1959, he was replaced by the military officer, Abdel Hakim Amer. He is also the first African member of the FIFA Executive Committee. He was present at the meeting of 8 which led to the birth of the Confederation of African Football (CAF), of which he became the first president from 1957 to 1958.

References

Sources
 

20th-century Egyptian engineers
Presidents of the Confederation of African Football
Association football executives
Year of birth missing
Year of death missing